Direct method may refer to

Direct method (education) for learning a foreign language
Direct method (computational mathematics) as opposed to iterative method
Direct methods (crystallography) for estimating the phases of the Fourier transform of the scattering density from the corresponding magnitudes
Direct method in calculus of variations for constructing a proof of the existence of a minimizer for a given functional
 Direct method (accounting) as opposed to indirect method for calculating cash flows